Taishan Subdistrict is a subdistrict in Quanshan District, Xuzhou, Jiangsu, China. , it has 9 residential communities under its administration.

See also 
 List of township-level divisions of Jiangsu

References 

Township-level divisions of Jiangsu
Administrative divisions of Xuzhou